Quem Matou Pixote? (English: Who Killed Pixote?) is a 1996 Brazilian drama biographical film directed by José Joffily. Based on the true story of Fernando Ramos da Silva, actor of Hector Babenco's Pixote: A Lei do Mais Fraco (1981).

Synopsis 
The story of Fernando Ramos da Silva, a semi-illiterate who became known when playing the title role in Pixote.

Cast 
Cassiano Carneiro ... Fernando Ramos da Silva (Pixote)
Luciana Rigueira ... Cida Venâncio da Silva
Joana Fomm ... Josefa
Tuca Andrada ... Cafu
Roberto Bomtempo ... Lobato
Carol Machado ... Ana Lúcia
Maria Luisa Mendonça ... Malu
Anselmo Vasconcelos ... Director
Antônio Petrin
Antonio Abujamra ... Lawyer
Paulo Betti ... TV director
Maria Lúcia Dahl ... Actress

Critical reception 
Emanuel Levy of Variety said that the film is "a disappointing dramatic reconstruction of the turbulent life and untimely death of child actor Fernando Ramos da Silva," and that "despite honorable intentions and an interesting life to relate, Pixote is not touching."

Awards 
Wins

 1996 Gramado Film Festival
 Popular jury award
 Best Film
 Best Actor (Cassiano Carneiro)
 Best Actress (Luciana Rigueira)
 Best Screenplay
 Best Cinematography
 Best Score
 1996 Havana Film Festival
 Best Actor (Cassiano Carneiro)
 1997 Cartagena Film Festival
 Best Actress (Luciana Rigueira) 
 Best Supporting Actor (Tuca Andrada and Roberto Bomtempo)

References

External links 
 Quem Matou Pixote? at IMDb

1996 films
1996 crime drama films
Brazilian crime drama films
1990s Portuguese-language films
Brazilian independent films
Social realism in film
1990s prison films
Films set in Rio de Janeiro (city)
Films shot in Rio de Janeiro (city)
Films set in the 1970s
Films set in 1979
Films set in the 1980s
Films set in 1984
Films set in 1987
Brazilian biographical drama films
1996 independent films